The 1976 Japanese Grand Prix was a Formula One motor race held at Fuji Speedway on 24 October 1976. It was the 16th and final race of the 1976 Formula One World Championship

The 1976 World Championship was to be decided at the Mount Fuji circuit, with Niki Lauda just three points ahead of James Hunt after a season full of incidents including Lauda's near-fatal crash at the Nürburgring and subsequent missed races.

Background

Entries

The field was almost unchanged from the previous race, but Noritake Takahara rented the second Surtees replacing Brett Lunger and Masami Kuwashima replaced Warwick Brown in the second Wolf-Williams. However, Kuwashima was himself replaced by Hans Binder during the meeting, after his money failed to materialize. Maki resurrected its Formula One car for Tony Trimmer while Heros Racing entered an old Tyrrell for Kazuyoshi Hoshino on Bridgestone tyres, which was the first Formula One start for the Japanese manufacturer. Kojima Engineering entered a locally built chassis for Masahiro Hasemi (on Dunlop tyres).

Championship standings before the race 

Heading into the final race of the season it was Niki Lauda who led the World Driver's Championship by three points ahead of James Hunt. In the Constructors' Championship it was Ferrari who had an eleven point lead over McLaren. As this was the final race of the season with 9 points available for the win it meant that the Japanese Grand Prix would decide the Driver's championship although Ferrari had confirmed their win the Constructors in the previous round.

Championship permutations 

For Lauda to win the Championship he needed:
 to finish ahead of Hunt
 to finish 3rd with Hunt 2nd
 to finish 4th or 5th with Hunt 3rd
 to finish 6th with Hunt 4th or lower
 Hunt to finish 5th or lower

For Hunt to win the Championship he needed to finish:
 1st
 2nd with Lauda 4th or lower
 3rd with Lauda 6th or lower
 4th with Lauda 7th or lower

Qualifying 
Mario Andretti took pole position in the Lotus 77, with Hunt alongside him on the front row and Lauda third. Then came John Watson in the Penske, Jody Scheckter, Carlos Pace, Clay Regazzoni and Vittorio Brambilla. The top 10 was completed by Ronnie Peterson and Hasemi. Trimmer failed to qualify the Maki.

Qualifying classification

Race 

On race day the weather was very wet with fog and running water at several places on the track. There were intense debates as to whether the race should be started; in the end the organisers decided to go ahead and a majority of drivers did not disagree. Some drivers, including Lauda, were not happy with the decision.

Hunt took the lead from the start with Watson and Andretti behind. On the second lap Watson slid down an escape road and Lauda drove into the pits to withdraw, as he believed the weather conditions made the track too dangerous. He later said "my life is worth more than a title." Larry Perkins made a similar decision after one lap, as did Pace and Emerson Fittipaldi later in the race.

Hunt continued to lead, behind him second place passed between Andretti and Brambilla. On lap 22 Brambilla challenged for the lead but spun out of contention before retiring 15 laps later with electrical problems. Jochen Mass moved into second before crashing on the 36th lap just before turn 7, promoting Patrick Depailler into the position with Andretti third.

It seemed Hunt was on for an easy win, but as the track began to dry he started to lose positions. He only needed a fourth place finish to win the title, because of Lauda's retirement. On lap 62 Hunt fell behind Depailler and Andretti, but two laps later Depailler's left rear tyre started to deflate and he had to pit. Andretti took the lead, but then Hunt had a similar tyre problem. Hunt pitted, dropped to fifth and set off after Depailler, Alan Jones and Regazzoni. Depailler overtook both drivers on lap 70 and on the next lap Hunt did the same and overtook both of them in order to win the World Drivers' Championship. However to his surprise as there was brief confusion as the immediate unofficial finish marked him as fifth place, but with quick deliberation the official finish was third. Ferrari won the Constructors' Championship despite Lauda's retirement.

Andretti's victory was his second in Formula One, coming five years, seven months and 18 days after his maiden win at the 1971 South African Grand Prix. , this is the longest period between a first and second victory of a driver in the series.

Race classification

Notes 
In Japan, the formal name of this Formula One event was not "Japanese Grand Prix" but was "Formula One World Championship in Japan" (F1世界選手権・イン・ジャパン), because an event of the Japanese Formula 2000 championship had been named "Japanese Grand Prix" in 1976.
It was initially announced that the fastest lap was set by Masahiro Hasemi on lap 25, but this was a measurement mistake, and, several days later, the circuit issued a press release to correct the fastest lap holder of the race to Jacques Laffite with a time of 1:19.97 on lap 70. This press release was promptly made known in Japan, and the Japan Automobile Federation (JAF) and Japanese media corrected the record. But this correction was not made well known outside Japan, thus, Hasemi is credited with the fastest lap of the race in many record books.

Championship standings after the race

Drivers' Championship standings

Constructors' Championship standings

References 

Japanese Grand Prix
Japanese Grand Prix
Grand Prix
October 1976 sports events in Asia